Brachypterus troglodytes is a species of short-winged flower beetle in the family Kateretidae. It is found in Europe and Northern Asia (excluding China) and North America.

References

Further reading

 

Kateretidae
Articles created by Qbugbot
Beetles described in 1864